"Teardrop" (also formatted as "Tear Drop") is a song by English trip hop group Massive Attack. Vocals are performed by Elizabeth Fraser, former lead singer of Cocteau Twins, who also wrote the lyrics. It was released on 27 April 1998 as the second single from the group's third studio album, Mezzanine (1998). A harpsichord-driven track, "Teardrop" was originally set to feature vocals from Madonna, whom Massive Attack turned down in favour of Fraser. 

In the United Kingdom, "Teardrop" peaked at number 10, becoming the group's highest-charting single and only top-ten hit in their native country. It reached number one in Iceland and became a top-twenty hit in Australia, Ireland, and New Zealand, as well as in Denmark in 2012. The music video, directed by Walter Stern, features a foetus singing in the womb, and the song has been featured in various television programmes, including as the opening theme for the U.S. television show House, an application that has been lauded by the show's British fans as fitting with the music video's medical motif.

Development
"Teardrop" was first developed from a simple harpsichord riff picked out in the studio in April 1997. Andrew Vowles, who was the main songwriter of this song, sent the demo to Madonna, as he wanted her to record the vocals for the song (the band had previously worked with her on their 1995 reworking of the song "I Want You"). The two other band members Robert Del Naja and Grantley Marshall wanted Elizabeth Fraser of the Cocteau Twins to record the vocals, feeling her ethereal style suited the mournful melody and feel of the piece. Madonna was very keen to record the vocals, and was disappointed when the two-to-one vote went in Fraser's favour. In 2023, Andrew Unterberger of Billboard wrote: "How ['Teardrop'] might've sounded with Madonna instead of Liz Fraser on vocals remains one of '90s pop's great what-ifs."

Fraser wrote the song's lyrics, inspired by the works of French philosopher Gaston Bachelard. While recording the song in 1997, she found out that Jeff Buckley, whom she had formerly had a relationship with, had disappeared—later discovered to have drowned. In 2009, she said, "That was so weird ... I'd got letters out and I was thinking about him. That song's kind of about him—that's how it feels to me anyway".

Critical reception
Larry Flick from Billboard wrote, "If there were ever a time for this clique of progressive groovemeisters to solidly connect with the stateside mainstream, it's now. The world has finally caught up with its experimental methods of blending dance rhythms with alterna-pop melodies. On this preview of the album Mezzanine, the band injects a bit of modern rock flavor into the mix - thus, widening the potential for airplay. Added programming incentive is provided by Brendan Lynch and Primal Scream, who add an aggressive bite to a track that bubbles with light electronic instrumentation."

Chart performance
The single peaked at number 16 in Australia. It placed number 22 in the Triple J Hottest 100 of All Time in 2009. It reached the top 10 in the UK and is the only Massive Attack track to do so. It was certified Platinum by the British Phonographic Industry on 10 May 2019.

Music video
The song's music video featured a latex foetus in the womb, singing the song. It was directed by Walter Stern.

Track listings

Charts

Weekly charts

Year-end charts

Certifications

Release history

Notable cover versions

Newton Faulkner

Newton Faulkner covered the song on his album Hand Built by Robots, which was produced by Mike Spencer. On downloads alone, Faulkner's version reached number 60 on the UK Singles Chart in August 2007. It was released as an official single on 10 December 2007, and reached number 57 on the chart the following week. The version of the album available from the Australian iTunes Music Store also incorporates an acoustic version.

O'Hooley & Tidow
English folk music duo O'Hooley & Tidow covered the song on their album The Fragile. The Guardian described their version of "Teardrop" as "an exquisite reworking" and it was voted by Guardian music critic Jude Rogers as one of the best tracks of 2012.

José González
José González covered "Teardrop" for his second album In Our Nature. The single was released across Europe on 12 November 2007. The single features the non-album instrumental B-side "Four Forks Ache." This version was also featured in the medical drama House M.D. in the episode "Wilson's Heart" as well as in the eighth episode of The Last Dance, ESPN's 10-part documentary series on Michael Jordan and the Chicago Bulls of the 1990s.

Civil Twilight 
South African band Civil Twilight released a cover version on 13 April 2010, included in the record "Live from SoHo", available only in iTunes. The band signed with Wind-Up Records, and released the studio version of the song as a single on 10 August 2010.

The Collective

The song was covered by English singer Gary Barlow's assembled supergroup named "the Collective" and released as the official single for Children in Need 2011. Produced by Labrinth, the performers consist of Chipmunk, Dot Rotten, Ed Sheeran, Ms. Dynamite, Mz. Bratt, Tulisa, Rizzle Kicks, Tinchy Stryder and Wretch 32.

The song was released in the United Kingdom on 13 November 2011 on the Polydor label. and entered the charts at number 24.

Charts

Release history

Simple Minds
Simple Minds recorded a version for their 2009 covers album Searching for the Lost Boys.

The Naked and Famous
New Zealand indie electronic band The Naked and Famous recorded a version for their 2018 stripped album A Still Heart. When asked why they decided to record a cover, Thom Powers explained, "It is one of those songs that is an amazing piece of music. It comes from the era that our name comes from. Our name comes from a line in a Tricky song."

AURORA
Norwegian electro-pop artist AURORA has performed this song several times, most notably at the Verftet festival on 29 March 2020.

Hayley Williams

American singer Hayley Williams, vocalist of Paramore, uploaded a cover on YouTube and Spotify on 15 January 2021.

References

1998 singles
1998 songs
2007 singles
2011 singles
Massive Attack songs
Music videos directed by Walter Stern
Number-one singles in Iceland
Songs written by Andrew Vowles
Songs written by Robert Del Naja
Comedy television theme songs
Trip hop songs
Virgin Records singles
Polydor Records singles